Rocca Santo Stefano is a  (municipality) in the Metropolitan City of Rome in the Italian region of Latium, located about  east of Rome.

Rocca Santo Stefano borders the following municipalities: Affile, Bellegra, Canterano, Gerano, Subiaco.

References

Cities and towns in Lazio